Gulshan Town is a Karachi borough in the northeastern part of Karachi. Gulshan Town was formed in 2001 as part of the Local Government Ordinance 2001, and was subdivided into 11 union councils. The town system was disbanded in 2011, and Gulshan Town was re-organized as sub-division of Karachi East District in 2015.

Gulshan-e-Iqbal restored as Town in January 2022.

Location 
Gulshan Town is bordered by Gadap Town to the north, the Faisal and Malir Cantonments to the east, Jamshed Town to the southwest, and Gulberg and Liaquatabad to the west.

History 
The federal government under Pervez Musharraf, who seized power in a 1999 coup d'etat, introduced local government reforms in the year 2000, which eliminated the previous "third tier of government" (administrative divisions) and replaced it with the fourth tier (districts). The effect in Karachi was the dissolution of the former Karachi Division in 2001, and the merging of its five districts to form a new Karachi City-District with eighteen autonomous constituent towns including Gulshan Town. In 2011, the system was disbanded but remained in place for bureaucratic administration until 2015, when the Karachi Metropolitan Corporation system was reintroduced. In 2015, Gulshan Town was re-organized as a sub-division as part of Karachi East district.

Gulshan-e-Iqbal town was restored as a Town in January 2022, which includes union committees 20, 21, 22, 23, 24, 25, 26 & 28.

Commissioner of Karachi (Syed Darbar Ali Shah) envisioned setting up a new town Gulshan-e-Iqbal on 16 April 1966. It was originally Karachi Development Authority (scheme 24) which was renamed in the name of Pakistan's national poet Allama Muhammad Iqbal. Gulshan Town saw a lot of development after setting up of Civic Centre, Karachi and Karachi Expo Center.

Demographics 
The population of Gulshan Town was estimated to be about 650,000 at the 1998 census, of which 99.5% are Muslim. Gulshan Town is Muhajir dominated area  with some minorities, which include Sindhis, Punjabis, Kashmiris, Seraikis, Pakhtuns, Balochis, etc. The population of Gulshan Town was estimated to be nearly one million before census 2017. A small number of Konkani Muslims are also settled in the Kokan Cooperative Housing Society of Gulshan-e-Iqbal Town.

Neighbourhoods 

Gulshan Town is the location of the main University of Karachi campus, as well as the offices of the City District Government of Karachi and the Attorney General of Sindh province. There are also few large parks which includes Aziz Bhatti Park, Askari Park, Aladin Park (now Bagh-e-Karachi) and the Safari Park.

Education 
Gulshan-e-Iqbal area may be called as a university town having more than a dozen of higher education institutions. Few of the major institutions are as follows:
 University of Karachi
 NED University of Engineering and Technology
 Institute of Business Administration, Karachi
 SSUET
 Federal Urdu University
 UIT University
 Aga Khan University
 Liaquat University of Medical & Health Sciences
 Indus University
 Karachi School of Arts
 Iqra University
and several others

See also 
 Zeenatabad Society 
 Sharfabad Society
 Bahadurabad
 City District Government
 Karachi
 Lahore

References

External links 
 Sindh E-Centralized College Admission Program (Archived)
 Hospitals In Gulshan Town (Archived)

 
Karachi East District
Towns in Karachi